Mil-Mughan Economic Region is one of the 14 economic regions of Azerbaijan. It borders Iran to the south, as well as the economic regions of Shirvan-Salyan, Central Aran, Karabakh, and Lankaran-Astara. The region consists of the districts of Beylagan, Imishli, Saatly, and Sabirabad. Its population was estimated to be at 522.6 thousand people in January 2021.

History 
Mil-Mughan Economic Region was established on 7 July 2021 as part of a reform of the economic region system of Azerbaijan. Its territory was part of the larger Aran Economic Region prior to 2021.

References 

Economic regions of Azerbaijan